Sascha Schünemann (born 20 February 1992) is a German footballer who plays for Hansa Rostock II.

Career

Hansa Rostock II
On 4 October 2019 it was confirmed that Schünemann had joined the reserve team of Hansa Rostock as a free agent after training with the team since summer 2019.

References

External links

1992 births
Living people
German footballers
Hannover 96 II players
Berliner FC Dynamo players
FC Hansa Rostock players
FC Viktoria 1889 Berlin players
Wuppertaler SV players
Footballers from Berlin
3. Liga players
Regionalliga players
Association football midfielders